Mohammed Rafik Khatri is an Indian craftsman from the village of Bagh, Madhya Pradesh. He is Bagh Print craftsman.

Awards
 National Award 2005 (Handicraft) by ministry of textiles, government of india.
 National Merit Award 2004 (Handicraft) by ministry of textiles, government of india.
 State Award 2002 by government of Madhya Pradesh.

References

Indian artisans
People from Dhar district
1970 births
Living people
Indian Muslims